Grass Pond Colony was located at the site of several large natural ponds which remain filled by water year-round due to natural springs, it is located in the northern part of Wilson County, Texas, U.S. about five miles south of Sutherland Springs.

Sources

"The Good Old Days: a history of LaVernia" by the Civic Government class of LaVernia High School, 1936–1937 school year."
"Wilson County Centennial 1860-1960"  By the Wilson county library, Centennial program handed out at The 100yr centennial celebration."
"Segregated schools of Wilson County" Floresville Chronicle Journal May 20, 1971.
"African Americans in Wilson County Texas", Jamie L. Harris, Lynbrook Books, 2006.
"Wilson County History", Diane Jimenez, Taylor Publishing Co. 1990

See also

Doseido Colony, Texas

External links
 Map of Grass Pond Colony
 

Geography of Wilson County, Texas
Ghost towns in Central Texas